William Malcolm (Bill) MacEachern (July 26, 1930 – March 1, 2020) was a politician in Nova Scotia, Canada.

He was born in Judique, Inverness County, Nova Scotia. In 1974, MacEachern was elected to represent the electoral district of Inverness County as a Liberal in the Nova Scotia House of Assembly, where he served until his defeat in the 1981 election. MacEachern served in the Executive Council of Nova Scotia in Gerald Regan's government as Minister of Public Health and Registrar General, and Minister of Social Services and Minister Responsible for the Status of Women. He died on March 1, 2020.

References

1930 births
2020 deaths
Nova Scotia Liberal Party MLAs
Members of the Executive Council of Nova Scotia
Nova Scotia Ministers of Health